Barbara Ruick (December 23, 1930 – March 3, 1974) was an American actress and singer.

Early years 
Ruick was the daughter of actors Lurene Tuttle and Melville Ruick, and grew up acting out scenes with dolls, employing her mother as an audience.

Ruick attended North Hollywood High School. She did little acting in high school but joined a school band at the age of 14. Ruick sang with the band at dances and benefits.

Career

Early in her career, Ruick sang in clubs and acted in Little Theater productions. She achieved success in radio prior to signing as a contract player with Metro-Goldwyn-Mayer. She was heard in the original radio version of Dragnet. She also recorded several songs for MGM Records. In the 1950s, Ruick starred as Kay in the first LP recording of the songs from George Gershwin and Ira Gershwin's 1926 Broadway musical, Oh, Kay!. This was a studio cast recording released by Columbia Records, and conducted by Lehman Engel.

She landed a job on Hollywood Screen Test, a talent show which aired on ABC Television from 1948 to 1953. Ruick appeared on the Kraft Television Theater, soap operas, and The College Bowl (1950), which was hosted by Chico Marx. She also performed for fifteen weeks on The Jerry Colonna Show. In 1955 she was a regular on The Johnny Carson Show.

She made guest appearances on The Millionaire (1957), Public Defender (1954), Brothers Brannigan (1960), The 20th Century Fox Hour (1956), and Climax Mystery Theater (1955).

In 1951, Ruick was signed by MGM for a role in the film Invitation (1952). She had bit parts in her first four films, one of them being The Band Wagon (1953), and then graduated to supporting roles. Her best remembered roles both came from Rodgers and Hammerstein. She played Carrie Pipperidge in the film version of Carousel (1956) and Esmerelda, one of the wicked stepsisters, in the 1965 TV version of Rodgers and Hammerstein's Cinderella.

Notable work
Confidentially Connie (1953)
The Affairs of Dobie Gillis (1953)
Carousel (1956)
Rodgers and Hammerstein's Cinderella (TV, 1965 remake, starring Lesley Ann Warren)

Marriages
Ruick married actor Robert Horton in Las Vegas, Nevada, on August 22, 1953. She had co-starred with Horton in the movie Apache War Smoke the previous year. The couple separated just prior to their second wedding anniversary in 1955 and divorced in 1956, just after he accompanied her to the world premiere of Carousel. She then married the young composer John Williams, who later became famous for Star Wars and many other films. Williams dedicated his First Violin Concerto to her memory (notes to DGG recording 289 471 326–2). During her marriage to Williams, Ruick appeared in few motion pictures. They had three children together, one of whom, Joseph Williams, is lead singer in the rock band Toto.

Death
Ruick died in Reno, Nevada, while playing a small role on location in  Robert Altman's California Split. She was found dead the afternoon of March 3, 1974 in her hotel room, where her body had been lying for 10 to 12 hours. She had complained of nausea and headache the previous night. The coroner found that her death was caused by a ruptured berry aneurysm and intracerebral hemorrhage.  She was interred at Forest Lawn Memorial Park, Glendale, California.

Filmography

Notes

References
 Charleston, West Virginia Daily Mail, Actress Found Dead In Hotel, Monday, March 4, 1974, Page 5B.
 Los Angeles Times, Barbara Ruick Real Gone Among Bop Set, July 6, 1952, Page D3.
 Los Angeles Times, Actress Wins Out Despite Head Start, August 16, 1953, Page D3.
 Los Angeles Times, Actress Barbara Ruick Files Suit For Divorce'', August 11, 1955, Page 4.

External links

 
 

1930 births
1974 deaths
20th-century American actresses
20th-century American singers
American film actresses
American television actresses
American radio actresses
Actresses from Pasadena, California
MGM Records artists
Metro-Goldwyn-Mayer contract players
Musicians from Pasadena, California
Burials at Forest Lawn Memorial Park (Glendale)
20th-century American women singers
North Hollywood High School alumni